Spirogyra is a genus of algae.

Spirogyra may also refer to:

 Spirogyra (band), a British folk/prog rock band
 Spyro Gyra, an American jazz fusion band
 Spirogyra Lake, a lake in the South Orkney islands